The Cottidae are a family of fish in the superfamily Cottoidea, the sculpins. It is the largest sculpin family, with about 275 species in 70 genera. They are referred to simply as cottids to avoid confusion with sculpins of other families.

Cottids are distributed worldwide, especially in boreal and colder temperate climates. The center of diversity is the northern Pacific Ocean. Species occupy many types of aquatic habitats, including marine and fresh waters, and deep and shallow zones. A large number occur in near-shore marine habitat types, such as kelp forests and shallow reefs. They can be found in estuaries and in bodies of fresh water.

Most cottids are small fish, under  in length.

Taxonomy
The Cottidae was first recognised as a taxonomic grouping by the French zoologist Charles Lucien Bonaparte in 1831. The composition of the family and its taxonomic relationships have been the subject of some debate among taxonomists. The 5th edition of Fishes of the World retains a rather conservative classification, although it includes the families Comephoridae and Abbyssocottidae as subfamilies of the Cottidae recogniseng that these taxa are very closely related to some of the freshwater sculpins in the genus Cottus. Other workers have found that Cottidae is largely restricted to the freshwater sculpins, i.e. Cottus, Leptocottus, Mesocottus, Trachidermus, and the species flock in and around Lake Baikal, and the marine genera are placed in the Psychrolutidae.

Genera

The genera of the family include:

 Subfamily Cottinae Bonaparte, 1831
 Alcichthys Jordan & Starks, 1904
 Andriashevicottus Fedorov, 1990
 Antipodocottus Bolin, 1952
 Archistes Jordan & Gilbert, 1898
 Argyrocottus Herzenstein, 1892
 Artediellichthys Fedorov, 1973
 Artediellina Taranetz, 1941
 Artedielloides Soldatov, 1922
 Artediellus Jordan, 1885
 Artedius Girard, 1856
 Ascelichthys Jordan & Gilbert, 1880
 Asemichthys Gilbert, 1912
 Astrocottus Bolin, 1936
 Atopocottus Bolin, 1936
 Bero Jordan & Starks, 1904
 Bolinia Yabe, 1991
 Chitonotus Lockington, 1879
 Clinocottus Gill, 1861
 Cottiusculus Jordan & Starks, 1904
 Cottocomephorus Pellegrin, 1900
 Cottus Linnaeus, 1758
 Daruma Jordan & Starks 1904
 Enophrys Swainson, 1839
 Furcina  Jordan & Starks, 1904
 Gymnocanthus Swainson, 1839
 Icelinus Jordan, 1885
 Icelus Krøyer, 1845
 Leiocottus Girard, 1856 
 Leocottus Palmer, 1961
 Lepidobero K. J. Qin & X. B. Jin, 1992
 Leptocottus Girard, 1854
 Megalocottus Gill, 1861
 Mesocottus Gratzianov, 1907
 Micrenophrys Andriashev, 1954
 Microcottus Schmidt, 1940
 Myoxocephalus Tilesius, 1811
 Ocynectes Jordan & Starks, 1904
 Oligocottus Girard 1856
 Orthonopias Starks & Mann, 1911
 Paracottus Taliev, 1949
 Phallocottus Schultz, 1938
 Phasmatocottus Bolin, 1936
 Porocottus Gill, 1859
 Pseudoblennius Temminck & Schlegel, 1850
 Radulinopsis Soldatov & Lindberg, 1930
 Radulinus Gilbert, 1890
 Rastrinus Jordan & Evermann, 1896
 Ricuzenius Jordan & Starks, 1904
 Ruscarius Jordan & Starks, 1895
 Sigmistes Rutter, 1898″
 Stelgistrum Jordan & Gilbert, 1898
 Stlengis Jordan & Starks, 1904
 Synchirus Bean, 1890
 Taurocottus Soldatov & Pavlenko, 1915
 Taurulus Gratzianov, 1907
 Trachidermis Heckel, 1837
 Thyriscus Gilbert & Burke, 1912
 Trichocottus Soldatov & Pavlenko, 1915
 Triglops Reinhardt, 1830
 Vellitor Jordan & Starks, 1904
 Zesticelus Jordan & Evermann, 1896
 subfamily Comephorinae Bonaparte, 1850
 Comephorus   Lacépède, 1800
 subfamily Abyssocottinae Berg, 1907
 Abyssocottus Berg, 1906
 Asprocottus Berg, 1906
 Batrachocottus Berg, 1903
 Cyphocottus Sideleva, 2003
 Cottinella  Berg, 1907
 Limnocottus  Berg, 1906
 Neocottus Sideleva, 1982
 Procottus Gratzianov, 1902

See also
List of fish families

References 

 
Cottoidea
Ray-finned fish families
Extant Oligocene first appearances
Taxa named by Charles Lucien Bonaparte